Menke Observatory  is an astronomical observatory owned and operated by St. Ambrose University. It is located northwest of Dixon, Iowa (USA) on the southern bank of the Wapsipinicon River. It is named after the former President of St. Ambrose, Monsignor Sebastian Menke, and moved to it current location in 1994.

See also 
List of astronomical observatories

References

External links
Dixon Clear Sky Clock Forecast of observing conditions covering Menke Observatory.

Astronomical observatories in Iowa
St. Ambrose University
Buildings and structures in Scott County, Iowa
Tourist attractions in Scott County, Iowa